Participatory rural appraisal (PRA) is an approach used by non-governmental organizations (NGOs) and other agencies involved in international development. The approach aims to incorporate the knowledge and opinions of rural people in the planning and management of development projects and programmes.

Origins 

The philosophical roots of participatory rural appraisal techniques can be traced to activist adult education methods such as those of Paulo Freire and the study clubs of the Antigonish Movement. In this view, an actively involved and empowered local population is essential to successful rural community development. Robert Chambers, a key exponent of PRA, argued that the approach owes much to "the Freirian theme, that poor and exploited people can and should be enabled to analyze their own reality."

By the early 1980s, there was growing dissatisfaction among development experts with both the reductionism of formal surveys, and the biases of typical field visits. In 1983, Robert Chambers, a Fellow at the Institute of Development Studies (UK), used the term rapid rural appraisal (RRA) to describe techniques that could bring about a "reversal of learning", to learn from rural people directly. Two years later, the first international conference to share experiences relating to RRA was held in Thailand. This was followed by a rapid acceptance of usage of methods that involved rural people in examining their own problems, setting their own goals, and monitoring their own achievements. By the mid 1990s, the term RRA had been replaced by a number of other terms including participatory rural appraisal (PRA) and participatory learning and action (PLA).

Robert Chambers acknowledged that the significant breakthroughs and innovations that informed the methodology came from community development practitioners in Africa, India and elsewhere. Chambers helped PRA gain acceptance among practitioners. Chambers explained the function of participatory research in PRA as follows:

Overview of techniques 
Over the years techniques and tools have been described in a variety of books and newsletters, or taught at training courses. However, the field has been criticized for lacking a systematic evidence-based methodology.

The basic techniques used include:
 Understanding group dynamics, e.g. through learning contracts, role reversals, feedback sessions
 Surveying and sampling, e.g. transect walks, wealth ranking, social mapping
 Interviewing, e.g. focus group discussions, semi-structured interviews, triangulation
 Community mapping, e.g. Venn diagrams, matrix scoring, ecograms, timelines

To ensure that people are not excluded from participation, these techniques avoid writing wherever possible, relying instead on the tools of oral communication and visual communication such as pictures, symbols, physical objects and group memory. Efforts are made in many projects, however, to build a bridge to formal literacy; for example by teaching people how to sign their names or recognize their signatures. Often developing communities are reluctant to permit invasive audio-visual recording.

Developmental changes in PRA 
Since the early 21st century, some practitioners have replaced PRA with the standardized model of community-based participatory research (CBPR) or with participatory action research (PAR). Social survey techniques have also changed during this period, including greater use of information technology such as fuzzy cognitive maps, e-participation, telepresence, social network analysis, topic models, geographic information systems (GIS), and interactive multimedia.....

See also

References

Further reading
 
 
 
 
 
 
 Participatory Learning and Action / PLA Notes archive. Started in the 1980s and first known as RRA Notes, then as PLA Notes, and then as Participatory Learning and Action, this archive of articles is a joint collaboration of the International Institute for Environment and Development (IIED) and the Institute of Development Studies (IDS).
 
 
 

International development
Rural community development
Group processes